The Association of Environmental Professionals (AEP) is a California-based non-profit organization of interdisciplinary professionals including environmental science, resource management, environmental planning and other professions contributing to this field.  AEP is the first organization of its kind in the USA, and its influence and model have spawned numerous other regional organizations throughout the United States, as well as the separate National Association of Environmental Professionals (NAEP).  Its mission is to improve the technical skills of members, and the organization is dedicated to "the enhancement, maintenance and protection of the natural and human environment".  From inception in the mid-1970s the organization has been closely linked with the upkeep of the California Environmental Quality Act (CEQA), California being one of the first states to adopt a comprehensive law to govern the environmental review of public policy and project review.

History, organization and governance

AEP was founded in the State of California in 1974 and held its first organization wide meeting of members in Palo Alto, California, on the Stanford University campus.  At that meeting the first directors and officers were elected and by-laws adopted.  From then on the board of directors has met quarterly to establish governance, coordinate legislative liaison and plan annual meeting.  There are nine AEP chapters, covering the California geographical regions of: Channel Counties, Inland Empire, Los Angeles County, Monterey Bay-Silicon Valley, Orange County, San Diego, San Francisco Bay Area, Superior, and Central.

Publications and member activities

AEP publishes a quarterly magazine, the Environmental Monitor, which contains technical articles, legislative updates and other information useful to its members.  As mentioned above the organization has developed a skilled legislative advocacy program, which is remarkable in its pursuit of clarity of language, efficient functioning of environmental review and ethical goals for its profession.  AEP also provides annual recognition awards for excellence in various categories, provides members with information on career development and works to achieve standards for performance in the environmental disciplines.

The Environmental Monitor magazine is recognized throughout the interdisciplinary professions as a leading source of state of the art coverage.  Articles may include topics of air quality, habitat conservation, water quality, archaeology, urban planning, acoustics and other technical matters; however coverage is also given to legislation, AEP activities and professional career development.

See also
Environmental design
Environmental engineering
Environmental management
Environmental studies
European Environmental Press (EEP)

References

External links
 Association of Environmental Professionals Website

Environmental organizations based in California
Environmental engineering
Environmental science
Environmental management-related professional associations